Bumpe is a small town in Bo District in the Southern Province of Sierra Leone. As of 2013 it had an estimated population of 16,123. The town is located south-west of Bo.

The town is also known as Bompeh, and both names are applied to a local river. Sir Samuel Rowe, the British Colonial Governor, visited the area in 1880.

Pan Pacific Investments Corporation (SL) Limited has a license to mine for diamonds in Bompeh.

See also
House of Kposowa
Mende people
Bumpe–Gao Chiefdom

References

Populated places in Sierra Leone